= New Media for a New Millennium =

New Media for a New Millennium (NM2) was a three-year-long, European Union-sponsored project, began in 2004, that aimed at creating software tools intend to ease editing of media content. The project ended in August 2007.
